Kostybe is a rural locality (a settlement) in Aktyubinsky Selsoviet of Volodarsky District, Astrakhan Oblast, Russia. The population was 528 as of 2010. There are 8 streets.

Geography 
Kostybe is located on the Ilmametyev River, 11 km northwest of Volodarsky (the district's administrative centre) by road. Stolbovoy is the nearest rural locality.

References 

Rural localities in Volodarsky District, Astrakhan Oblast